Aquinas High School is a private, Roman Catholic high school in San Bernardino, California, United States.  It is located in the Roman Catholic Diocese of San Bernardino.

History
Aquinas High School is a co-educational institution accredited by the Western Association of Schools and Colleges and the Western Catholic Education Association. The Aquinas student experiences a traditional liberal arts curriculum that requires the pursuit of the college preparatory disciplines. The school works energetically to keep tuition affordable in the face of increasing costs each year. The school is deeply concerned that Catholic education is available to all students who could benefit and fulfill entrance requirements, without regard to the financial status of their household.
 
On June 15, 1954, Bishop Charles F. Buddy of the Diocese of San Diego (of which San Bernardino was then a part) announced Aquinas Hall would open the following academic year as a boys' Catholic high school. The school opened in 1955 with forty-nine freshmen. Bishop Buddy blessed the new facility on November 11, 1955. St. Bernadine's High School was an all-girl school, which closed its doors on its 50th anniversary in 1971. Its student body merged with Aquinas Hall, forming the co-educational Aquinas High School..

The 27-acre campus in located in a residential neighborhood north of State Hwy 210 between the Del Rosa and Highland Avenue exits. There are 10 buildings, consisting of 24 classrooms, 3 science labs, 1 computer lab, library, chapel, school store, snack bar and counselors' offices, administrative and student support spaces. Athletic facilities include a gymnasium, 350 seat performing arts center, football stadium with synthetic track, 2 locker rooms, tennis courts, and softball, baseball and soccer fields.  In the spring of 2006 the football field was refurbished, bringing in a new playing surface and lighting.  A new fence, entry walls, student drop-off area, and landscaping were completed in 2006.  This was followed by the construction of the Fr. Devine Tennis Center.  This facility provided Aquinas with six lit courts for their league champion Lady Falcon tennis team. Other improvements include the remodeling of the Bill Lemann Baseball Complex, the Lady Falcon softball field, the renovation of the quad area, and remodels of most of the restrooms on campus.

The 2011–2012 school year saw the dedication of the Rezek Student Center and the Matich Science Center.  Both facilities allow students the use of technology to enhance their educational experience.  2017 saw the opening of the San Manuel Performing Arts Center, a 350 seat state-of-the-art live performance venue and the Lemann Leadership Center.  Theses two new facilities created a new administration office as well as new public entrance to the school.  That year also saw the opening of the refurbished Aquinas-Gogo Gymnasium.  The remodel includes The Jack Henley Hall of Champions.  This area serves as a new lobby to the gym as well as space to celebrate the schools athletic achievements.

Academics
Aquinas offers 24 AP courses and 15 honors courses.  The school is also known for its pre-professional academies.  These are divided into several fields including; healthcare, law, engineering, and visual and performing arts.  The visual and performing arts academy consists of four "strands".  These are visual arts, digital arts, musical arts, and performing arts.

Athletics
Since the inception of the Falcon sports program Aquinas has maintained a consistent level of success, in particular the boys' basketball, football, boys' soccer, softball, and baseball teams. In the summer of 2017 Aquinas was chosen as an official Nike school which allowed for the outfitting of the Falcon athletic teams exclusively in Nike apparel. 2022 saw Aquinas end it's association with Nike and reach an agreement with Adidas to become the official outfitter of Aquinas Athletics.  Aquinas athletic teams have won over 130 league championships, 10 CIF championships, and 3 state championships.

Football – 1958, 1960, 1962, 1964, 1968, 1979, 1981, 1985, 2005, 2007, 2008, 2009, 2010, 2016, 2017, 2018, 2019, 2021, 2022
 CIF Champions 2000, 2005, 2017, 2019, 2021
 CIF Runner-Up 2016
 State South Region Champions 2019, 2021
 State South Region Runner-Up 2017
 State Champions 2005
 State Runner-Up 2019, 2021

Girls' Volleyball – 1999, 2000, 2012, 2013

Girls' Tennis – 1982, 1983, 1984, 2004, 2005, 2006, 2011, 2015, 2016, 2017, 2019
 CIF Runner-Up 2005, 2010

Boys' Basketball – 1960, 1962, 1963, 1964, 1966, 1968, 1969, 1970, 1971, 1972, 1973, 1980, 1983, 1984, 1988, 2008, 2009, 2010, 2020, 2021, 2023
 CIF Champions 1973, 2021 
 CIF Runner-Up 1968, 1969, 2020
 State South Region Champions 2021
 State Champions 2021

Girls' Basketball – 1983, 1992, 1993, 2001, 2014, 2015, 2016, 2017, 2018

Boys' Soccer – 1982, 1983, 1988, 1989, 1993, 1995, 1996, 1997, 1998, 1999, 2018, 2021, 2022
 CIF Champions 1998, 2018

Girls' Soccer – 1990

Wrestling – 1979, 1984, 1985

Baseball – 1959, 1963, 1964, 1965, 1966, 1968, 1969, 1970, 1979, 1980, 1981, 1982, 1983, 1984, 1985, 1986, 1987, 1988, 1990, 1997, 2021, 2022

Softball – 1983, 1985, 2009, 2010, 2011, 2012, 2013, 2014, 2015, 2017, 2018, 2019, 2021, 2022
 CIF Champions 2013
 Division 5 State Champions 2013

Boys' Swimming - 2021

Golf – 1983, 1984, 2000, 2009

Boys' Tennis - 2021

Boys' Track – 1958, 1988, 2003, 2004, 2005, 2022

Girls' Track – 2003, 2004

Girls' Cross Country – 2009, 2010

Notable alumni
Rod Pacheco, district attorney and politician
Chris Parker, American football player

References

Catholic secondary schools in California
Educational institutions established in 1955
High schools in San Bernardino County, California
Education in San Bernardino, California
1955 establishments in California